Glendinning is a surname, of Scottish origin.

Brian Glendinning (born 1934), English footballer
 Chellis Glendinning (born 1947), psychotherapist
 Ernest Glendinning (1884–1936), British-born American stage actor
 James Glendinning (1849–1929), Canadian politician
 Kevin Glendinning (born 1962), English footballer
 Mark Glendinning (born 1970), Northern Irish footballer
 Paul Glendinning, English mathematician
 Robert Glendinning (1844–1928), Irish politician
 Robin Glendinning (born 1938), Northern Irish playwright and politician
 Ross Glendinning (born 1956), Australian footballer, after whom the Ross Glendinning Medal is named
 S. Gail Glendinning, American physicist
 Simon Glendinning (born 1964), English philosopher, son of Victoria
 Victoria Glendinning (born 1937), English writer, mother of Paul
 Will Glendinning, Northern Irish politician

See also
Glendenning (disambiguation)